Mycobacterium neworleansense  is a member of the Mycobacterium fortuitum third biovariant complex.

References

External links
Type strain of Mycobacterium neworleansense at BacDive -  the Bacterial Diversity Metadatabase

Acid-fast bacilli
neworleansense
Bacteria described in 2004